Maja Anić (born 25 December 1988 in Osijek) is a Croatian rower. Since 2009, Anić competes in coxless pairs with Sonja Kešerac.

References

External links 
 

1988 births
Living people
Croatian female rowers
Sportspeople from Osijek
European Rowing Championships medalists